The Powder Magazine is a surviving structure of the Civilian Conservation Corps (CCC) camp of the 1707th Company. The structure was built to house the camp's explosives, which were typically used by the camp crew for road and bridge building projects.

The structure was listed on the National Register of Historic Places in 1993.

See also
National Register of Historic Places listings in Scott County, Arkansas

References

Buildings and structures on the National Register of Historic Places in Arkansas
Buildings and structures completed in 1935
Buildings and structures in Scott County, Arkansas
Ouachita National Forest
Civilian Conservation Corps in Arkansas
Gunpowder magazines
National Register of Historic Places in Scott County, Arkansas
1935 establishments in Arkansas